2012: Zwanzig Zwölf is the fifth full-length album American industrial metal band Hanzel und Gretyl. It was released via Metropolis Records on February 5, 2008. It was based on the idea that in the year 2012, Hanzel und Gretyl will play a show at one of the ancient Mayan temples that will actually reveal itself to be a space ship. This space ship will then take HuG on a tour around the universe.

Track listing

Personnel 
 Kaizer von Loopy – vocals, guitar, programming
 Vas Kallas – lead vocals, bass

References

External links 
Official Hanzel und Gretyl website
Official MySpace page
Metropolis Records
Kevorkian Mastering, Inc

Hanzel und Gretyl albums
2008 albums
German-language albums
Metropolis Records albums